Arie Cornelis Loef (born 11 February 1969) is a retired speed skater from the Netherlands who was active between 1987 and 1994. He competed at the 1992 and  1994 Winter Olympics in the 500 m and 1000 m with the best achievement of 14th place in the 1000 m in 1992. He won four national titles: in the 500 m (1990), 1000 m (1990) and sprint allround (1989 and 1991).

He married Anke Baier, an Olympic speed skater from Germany.

Personal bests: 
500 m – 37.18 (1994)
 1000 m – 1:14.03 (1989)
 1500 m – 1:57.15 (1993)
 5000 m – 7:56.17 (1987)

References

1969 births
Dutch male speed skaters
Speed skaters at the 1992 Winter Olympics
Speed skaters at the 1994 Winter Olympics
Olympic speed skaters of the Netherlands
Sportspeople from Gorinchem
Living people
20th-century Dutch people
21st-century Dutch people